The 1978 Dutch Open was a Grand Prix men's tennis tournament staged in Hilversum, Netherlands. The tournament was played on outdoor clay courts and was held from 24 July until 30 July 1978. It was the 22nd edition of the tournament. Third-seeded Balázs Taróczy won the singles title, his second at the event after 1976.

Finals

Singles
 Balázs Taróczy defeated  Tom Okker 2–6, 6–1, 6–2, 6–4
 It was Taróczy's first singles title of the year and the third of his career.

Doubles
 Tom Okker /  Balázs Taróczy defeated  Bob Carmichael /  Mark Edmondson 7–6, 4–6, 7–5

References

External links
 ITF tournament edition details

Dutch Open (tennis)
Dutch Open (tennis)
Dutch Open
Dutch Open
Dutch Open (tennis), 1978